Civil Council is a political association that announced the recruitment of volunteers into the ranks of national units within the Armed Forces of Ukraine, including the Russian Volunteer Corps (RDC), as well as regional and national organizations of civil resistance in Russia.

History
The Civil Council was established in Warsaw, on November 2, 2022, they announced themselves publicly. According to the secretary of the council, Anastasia Sergeeva, there was a long process, when a group of leaders from different regions of Russia was formed. Taking the Kalinovsky regiment as an example, it was decided to recruit Russians who want to more effectively fight the Putin regime, both in the ranks of the Armed Forces of Ukraine and by training professionals for resistance groups inside Russia. Anastasia Sergeeva called the RDK the only unit of Russian citizens in the Armed Forces of Ukraine, in contrast to the Freedom of Russia Legion, which “to this day is shrouded in a veil of mystery”, despite statements about its existence. It took several months to agree on the recruitment regulations. A major role was played by Isa Akaev, who since 2014 led the Krym Battalion.

Squad
The council included representatives of Dagestan, Karachay-Cherkessia (Ibragim Yaganov), Chechnya (Saikhan Muzaev), Kabardino-Balkaria, Krasnoyarsk and Primorsky territories, Irkutsk region, Yakutia, Tatarstan.

In addition, the council includes:
 international secretary Anastasia Sergeeva
 Denis Sokolov, Coordinator of the Civil Resistance Center
 director of the mobilization center Denis Mikhailov
 executive secretary

See also
 Russian Volunteer Corps
 Freedom of Russia Legion

References

External links 
 Official site
 Manifesto of the «Civil Council»

Resistance during the 2022 Russian invasion of Ukraine